Pukhavichy (Puchavičy, Pukhovichi) may refer to:

 Puchavičy, Minsk Voblast, a village in Belarus
 Pukhavichy, Homiel Voblast, a village in Belarus